I Have a Lover is a 2015-2016 South Korean television series starring Kim Hyun-joo, Ji Jin-hee, Park Han-byul and Lee Kyu-han. It aired on SBS's Saturdays and Sundays at 22:00 (KST) time slot from August 22, 2015 to February 28, 2016 for 50 episodes. Kim Hyun-joo and Ji Jin-hee previously starred together in Miss Kim's Million Dollar Quest (2004).

Plot
The ambitious and successful lawyer Do Hae-gang (Kim Hyun-joo) and her husband, Choi Jin-eon (Ji Jin-hee) have a dysfunctional relationship. They lose their child and Jin-eon starts an affair with a much younger girl, Seol-ri (Park Han-byul). Dokgo Yong-gi is Do Hae-gang's unknown twin sister. After the couple divorce, Hae-gang gets into a mysterious car accident and loses her memory. Baek Seok (Lee Kyu-han), mistaking Hae-gang as Yong-gi, saves Hae-gang and makes her live as Yong-gi. Hae-gang becomes Baek-seok's fiancé and lives with his family. What will happen when Jin-eon and Hae-gang meet again? Will the couple be able to go back to how they used to be before?

Cast

Main characters
Kim Hyun-joo as Do Hae-gang (Birth Name: Dokgo On-gi) / Dokgo Yong-gi
Ji Jin-hee as Choi Jin-eon
Park Han-byul as Kang Seol-ri
Lee Kyu-han as Baek Seok

Supporting characters
Choi Jin-eon's family
Dokgo Young-jae as Choi man-ho, Jin-eon's father
Na Young-hee as Hong Se-hee, Jin-eon's mother
Baek Ji-won as Choi Jin-li, Jin-eon's half-sister
Gong Hyung-jin as Min Tae-seok, Jin-li's husband

Dokgo Yong-gi / Do Hae-gang sisters' family
Kim Chung as Kim Kyu-nam, the sisters' mother
Kang Boo-ja as Nam Cho-rok, Yong-gi's grandmother
Kim Ha-yoo as Dokgo Woo-joo, Yong-gi's daughter, alias Zhang Ling

Baek Seok's family
Choi Jung-woo as Baek Jun-sang, Baek Seok's father
Seo Ji-hee as Baek Ji
Park Ha-young as young Baek Ji
Seo Dong-hyun as Baek Hyun
Shin Soo-yeon as Baek Jo
Lee Chae-mi as young Baek Jo
Kim Do-yeop as Baek Bum
Ahn Jung-woo as Baek Jun

Extended cast
Lee Jae-yoon as Min Kyu-suk, Tae-seok's brother
Seo Dong-won as Go Hyun-woo, Jin-eon's friend
Lee Seung-hyung as Kim Tae Ho, Tae-seok's right-hand man
Jang Won-young as Manager Byun Gang-seok, Yong-gi's direct supervisor
Kim Bo-jung as Song Mi-ae, Yong-gi's colleague/friend
Kang Seo-jun as Yong-gi's colleague
Lee Jae-woo as Kim Sun-yong, Yong-gi's fiancée
Lee Sang-hoon as guy ordered by Tae-seok to follow Yong-gi
Lee Si-won as Lee Hae Joo, Teracop case plaintiff
Hwang Min-ho as Lee Hae Joo's husband
Han Dong-hwan as Lee Hae Joo's attorney
Kim Ho-chang
Lee Ji-yeon
Seo Bo-ik
Ahn Sung-gun
Kang Jun-seok
Kim Yong-wan
Jo Ha-lin
Park Jung-min
Lee Won-jang
Han Yeol

Original soundtrack

Part 1

Part 2

Part 3

Awards and nominations

Notes
 Episodes 11 and 12 were postponed due to the airing Chuseok special broadcast. Episode 11 was aired on 3 October 2015, and episode 12 was aired on 4 October 2015.
 The broadcast of episode 22 scheduled on 8 November 2015 was cancelled due to the baseball match.
 The broadcast of episode 23 scheduled on 15 November 2015 was cancelled due to the baseball match.
 Episode 23 broadcast on 21 November 2015 was delayed by almost 50 minute due to a baseball game.
 The broadcast of episode 34 scheduled on 27 December 2015 was cancelled due to the SBS Gayo Daejun.
 The broadcast of episode 38 scheduled on 16 January 2016 was cancelled due to the SBS Sports 2016 Olympic qualifier game between South Korea and Yemen.

References

External links
  
 
 

Seoul Broadcasting System television dramas
2015 South Korean television series debuts
2016 South Korean television series endings
Korean-language television shows
South Korean melodrama television series
South Korean romance television series
Television series by IWill Media